The 1920 Georgia Tech Golden Tornado football team represented the Georgia Tech Golden Tornado of the Georgia Institute of Technology during the 1920 Southern Intercollegiate Athletic Association football season. The Tornado was coached by William Alexander in his first year as head coach. The team compiled a record of 8–1 (4–0 SIAA), outscored opponents 312 to 16, and tied for first place with Georgia and Tulane in the Southern Intercollegiate Athletic Association (SIAA).

Georgia Tech played its home games at Grant Field. Its only loss was a controversial one to Pop Warner's Pittsburgh Panthers at Forbes Field. Florent Gibson of the Pittsburgh Post rated Tech as the best team in the country. Tech also handed Centre College its first loss to a southern team since 1916.

Several players received postseason honors. Tackle Bill Fincher made Walter Camp's first-team All-American, then just the fourth Southern player to do so. Captain and senior halfback Buck Flowers made some third-team All-America selections, and led the country with an average of 49.4 yards per punt.

Before the season
After last season, former coach John Heisman resigned and left Atlanta. New head coach William Alexander retained Heisman's scheme, using the pre-snap movement of his "jump shift" offense. One report reads: "Since Coach Alex has taken charge there is a change in the team. The youngest coach in major football, he is probably the most popular, and bids fair to prove himself the peer of them all. Not only is Coach the idol of members of the team, but of the student body as well." Former Tech running back and Chippewa Indian Joe Guyon assisted Alexander.

In 1920, football used a one-platoon system in which players played both offense, defense, and special teams. The team's most prominent players were in the backfield, including senior captain and halfback Buck Flowers, a small back who also handled drop kicks and punting. As a safety on defense, no player ever got past him for a touchdown. Halfback Red Barron running behind  fullback Judy Harlan was also renowned for its power. Most prominent in the line was tackle Bill Fincher, who also was the team's placekicker. Fincher had a glass eye which he would covertly pull out after feigning an injury, turn to his opponents and say: "So that's how you want to play!"

Schedule

Season summary

Week 1: Wake Forest
The first game of the year saw Georgia Tech pitted against the Wake Forest Demon Deacons. Tech won 44 to 0. Judy Harlan scored the year's first touchdown. Wake Forest failed to net a single first down. Harlan and Red Barron scored two touchdowns each and quarterbacks Jack McDonough and Pinkey Hunt one each. Captain Flowers gained consistently, and also drop-kicked a 26-yard field goal.

Week 2: Oglethorpe

Sources:

In the second week of play, Georgia Tech defeated Jogger Elcock's Oglethorpe Stormy Petrels 55 to 0. Buck Flowers had a 68-yard touchdown run. He got his start on a "criss-cross" play near his own 32-yard line, and ran for the touchdown crossing the field laterally many times showing an assortment of moves.

The starting lineup was: J. Staton (left end), Fincher (left tackle), Lebey (left guard), Amis (center), O. Davis (right guard), A. Staton (right tackle), Ratterman (right end), McDonough (quarterback), Flowers (left halfback), Barron (right halfback), Harlan (fullback)

Week 3: Davidson

Sources:

On October 9, Georgia Tech defeated the Davidson Wildcats 66 to 0. Red Barron scored four touchdowns, including an interception return of 76 yards. He also ran in a touchdown from 25 yards out after catching a forward pass from fullback Judy Harlan. Tech attempted six passes the whole game, completing 3 for 114 yards. One of Flowers' punts went 85 yards, the longest in school history.

The starting lineup was: J. Staton (left end), Fincher (left tackle), Lebey (left guard), Amis (center), O. Davis (right guard), A. Staton (right tackle), Ratterman (right end), McDonough (quarterback), Flowers (left halfback), Barron (right halfback), Harlan (fullback)

Week 4: at Vanderbilt

Sources:

Georgia Tech dominated in a week 4 win over the Vanderbilt Commodores. The 44 to 0 victory was one of the largest at Old Dudley Field.

Georgia Tech had entered into the main part of its schedule after three dominating wins. Upcoming engagements with Vanderbilt, Pittsburgh, and Centre were said to determine the season's outcome. Pittsburgh and Centre–but Pittsburgh especially, were the biggest opponents. Vanderbilt was seen as the warm up act to these two, for it was far superior to any of Tech's prior games. The first game of the year to have direct implications for the Southern championship, it was cited by some as the most interesting southern contest of the week.

The Golden Tornado was the clear favorite. Georgia Tech outplayed Vanderbilt and had the ball for three-fourths of the game. Several of Vanderbilt's players left with injuries. Its ends were easily skirted by the Tech backs Buck Flowers, Red Barron, and Frank Ferst. Tech's first touchdown came when Barron ripped off a 55-yard run. Captain Flowers once made a drop kick from 44 yards out. Ferst came in for Flowers in the middle of the second quarter when Georgia Tech started to use substitutes.

The third quarter saw Vanderbilt's one exciting offensive drive. "With Godchaux, Kuhn, and Raeburn subbing in the backfield, the Commodores opened a series of forward passes and runs that netted about 50 yards before Flowers intercepted a long pass on his own 10-yard line and raced 50 yards before being pushed out of bounds by a Vandy tackler". Fumbles cost Vanderbilt; one by Grailey Berryhill lead to Tech's third touchdown. In the fourth quarter, a fight broke out involving Gink Hendrick, some Tech players, and spectators. Tech lost some 133 yards from penalties during the contest.

The starting lineup was: J. Staton (left end), A. Staton (left tackle), O. Davis (left guard), Amis (center), Lebey (right guard), Fincher (right tackle), Ratterman (right end), McDonough (quarterback), Flowers (left halfback), Barron (right halfback), Harlan (fullback).

Week 5: at Pitt

Sources:

The Golden Tornado suffered its only loss at the hands of Pop Warner's Pittsburgh Panthers at Forbes Field by a score of 10 to 3. The game was controversial and Pitt was considered lucky to have won, such that after the game Pitt's own players and coaches led the praise for Tech. Tech halfback Red Barron played with a broken jaw suffered during the Vanderbilt game. Coach Warner called Barron the greatest halfback ever to perform on Forbes Field. Pitt fullback Orville "Tiny" Hewitt injured Tech quarterback Jack McDonough's ankle, and Frank Ferst had to take his place for the rest of the season.

In the first quarter, Pitt back Tom Davies was injured. Buck Flowers made the only points of the half with a 20-yard drop-kick. Flowers' performance against Pitt caused Grantland Rice to call him one of the best broken field runners in the country. His tackling on defense also drew praise.

At the beginning of the fourth quarter, Hewitt plunged over for a touchdown. By then Davies had returned and added the extra point. He later also added a 30-yard field goal. Due to concern's over Tech players' eligibility, Pitt refused to schedule another game with Georgia Tech.

The starting lineup was: J. Staton (left end), Fincher (left tackle), Lebey (left guard), Amis (center), O. Davis (right guard), A. Staton (right tackle), Ratterman (right end), McDonough (quarterback), Flowers (left halfback), Barron (right halfback), Harlan (fullback).

Week 6: Centre

Sources:

Arguably the highlight of the year was the defeat of the Centre Praying Colonels by a score of 24 to 0. It was Centre's first loss to a southern team since 1916. A story goes that tackle Bill Fincher sought to knock Centre quarterback "Bo" McMillin out of the game, taking with him brass-knuckles or "something equally diabolical."  Before the game, Fincher said "You're a great player Bo...I feel awful sorry about it because you are not going to be in there very long—about three minutes."

Red Barron starred in the game, including a 57-yard touchdown run: "twisting and dodging through the desperate Centre secondary." In the third quarter, Ferst ran 55 yards for a score.

One writer claimed: "even the great "Bo" McMillin was powerless against the Tech players." The Atlanta Constitution reported: "McMillin's forward passes outdid anything of the kind seen here in many years, but Tech seemed to know where they were going."

The starting lineup was: J. Staton (left end), Fincher (left tackle), Lebey (left guard), Amis (center), O. Davis (right guard), A. Staton (right tackle), Ratterman (right end), Ferst (quarterback), Flowers (left halfback), Barron (right halfback), Harlan (fullback).

Week 7: Clemson

Sources:

Coach Alexander rested his starters for the game against the Clemson Tigers and played substitutes throughout: "to teach the gamblers and point-makers a lesson." Sub quarterback Pinkey Hunt scored the lone touchdown in the final quarter.

End Georgie Ratterman was under treatment by a stomach specialist as the result of trouble supposedly caused by over-exertion during his confinement in a German prison during World War I. It was not known if he could still play.

The starting lineup was: Mayer (left end), McCree (left tackle), Webb (left guard), Johnson (center), Berry (right guard), Lyman (right tackle), Gringer (right end), Glaver (quarterback), Brewster (left halfback), Scarboro (right halfback), Rushing (fullback)

Week 8: Georgetown

Sources:

In the eighth week of play, the Golden Tornado faced the Georgetown Blue and Gray coached by former Carlisle great Albert Exendine, and won 35 to 6. Exendine countered claims of Tech running up the score, saying his safety men were not playing their best. "The sportsmanship displayed by the Golden Tornado was all that could be desired", said Exendine. The outstanding feature of the game was Flowers' 80-yard, off-tackle touchdown run, still one of the longest in school history. One of Flowers' punts went 82 yards.  Ed Hamilton was umpire.

The starting lineup was: J. Staton (left end), Fincher (left tackle), Lebey (left guard), Amis (center), O. Davis (right guard), Johnson (right tackle), A. Staton (right end), Ferst (quarterback), Flowers (left halfback), Barron (right halfback), Harlan (fullback)

Week 9: Auburn

Sources:

On November 25, Georgia Tech defeated the Auburn Tigers at Grant Field by a score of 34 to 0 for a share of the SIAA title.  The Tigers had a powerful eleven, which beat Vanderbilt 56 to 6 to counter Tech's 44 to 0 win, and set a school record with 332 points in nine games. Some Auburn fans before the game predicted a victory over Tech and the conference title.

Flowers scored three touchdowns in the game, including punt returns of 82 and 65 yards and a 33-yard run from scrimmage, and also passed for a fourth touchdown. Flowers also kicked a punt that went 65 yards in the air against Auburn. Sportswriter Morgan Blake said about Flowers' play against Auburn: "The Auburn Tiger came up with claws sharpened. As he writhed in death agony when the battle was over, he made one request, 'Please omit Flowers'."

The Atlanta Journal wrote that Flowers was: "flitting like a phantom, an undulating, rippling, chromatic phantom, over the whitewashed lines." The yearbook remarked Bill Fincher: "began his great work on the sand lots of Tech Hi here in Atlanta years ago and ended it up by smearing "Fatty" Warren of the Auburn Tigers all over the flats of Grant Field on Turkey Day last."

The starting lineup was: J. Staton (left end), Fincher (left tackle), Lebey (left guard), Amis (center), Davis (right guard), A. Staton (right tackle), Ratterman (right end), Ferst (quarterback), Flowers (left halfback), Barron (right halfback), Harlan (fullback).

Postseason

Awards and honors
Nine of the eleven starters made some writer's All-Southern team. Bill Fincher was selected first-team All-American by Walter Camp.  He was just the fourth southern player to receive this honor. Fincher made 31 PAT attempts on the year, and closed his career with a record 122 of 136.

Captain Flowers was selected as a third-team All-American by the United Press and the International News Service. Records conflict as to his rushing totals during the 1920 season. According to one account, which acknowledged it was based on incomplete records, Flowers rushed 80 times for 819 yards (10.2 yards per carry), and had 290 punt return yards (16.5 yards per return), in six games. According to another account, published by the United Press in 1958, Flowers rushed for 1,425 yards in 1920. He also led the country with an average of 49.4 yards per punt; and had a school record for number of drop kicked field goals. Coach Alexander said Flowers was the best punter Tech ever had and the best back he ever coached, calling him "pound for pound, my greatest player".

Championships
Rooters on either side of Georgia were happy as both Georgia and Tech claimed SIAA titles. Florent Gibson of the Pittsburgh Post rated Tech as the best team in the country.

Personnel

Depth chart
The following chart provides a visual depiction of Tech's lineup during the 1920 season with games started at the position reflected in parenthesis. The chart mimics the offense after the jump shift has taken place.

Starters

Line

Backfield

Substitutes

Line

Backfield

Scoring leaders
The following is an incomplete list of statistics and scores, largely dependent on newspaper summaries.

Coaching staff
Head coach: William Alexander
Backfield coach: Joe Guyon
Line coach: Fay Wood
Reserve coach: Kid Clay
Freshman coach: George C. Griffin
Manager: F. L. Asbury, Jr.

See also
1920 Southern Intercollegiate Athletic Association football season
1920 College Football All-Southern Team
1920 College Football All-America Team

Notes

Endnotes

References
 

Georgia Tech
Georgia Tech Yellow Jackets football seasons
Georgia Tech Golden Tornado football
1920s in Atlanta